The following is an overview of 1922 in film, including significant events, a list of films released and notable births and deaths.

Top-grossing films (U.S.)
The top nine films released in 1922 by U.S. gross are as follows:

Events
 June 11 – United States première of Robert J. Flaherty's Nanook of the North, the first commercially successful feature length documentary film.
 November 26 – The Toll of the Sea, starring Anna May Wong and Kenneth Harlan, debuts as the first general release film to use two-tone Technicolor (The Gulf Between was the first film to do so but it was not widely distributed).

Notable films released in 1922
United States unless stated

A
At the Sign of the Jack O'Lantern (lost), directed by Lloyd Ingraham, based on the 1905 novel by Myrtle Reed

B
The Bachelor Daddy (lost), directed by Alfred E. Green, starring Thomas Meighan
The Beautiful and Damned (lost), directed by William A. Seiter, starring Marie Prevost
Beauty's Worth, directed by Robert G. Vignola, starring Marion Davies
Beyond the Rocks, directed by Sam Wood, starring Gloria Swanson and Rudolph Valentino
A Bill of Divorcement, directed by Denison Clift, starring Constance Binney and Fay Compton – (GB)
The Blacksmith, directed by Mal St. Clair and Buster Keaton, starring Buster Keaton
A Blind Bargain (lost), directed by Wallace Worsley, starring Lon Chaney, based on the 1897 novel The Octive of Claudius by Barry Pain
Blood and Sand, directed by Fred Niblo, starring Rudolph Valentino, Lila Lee and Nita Naldi
The Bohemian Girl, directed by Harley Knoles, Starring Ivor Novello and Gladys Cooper  – (GB)
The Bride's Play, directed by George Terwilliger, starring Marion Davies
The Burning Soil (Der brennende Acker), directed by F. W. Murnau – (Germany)

C
The Card, directed by A. V. Bramble – (GB)
Clarence (lost), directed by William C. deMille, starring Wallace Reid, Agnes Ayres and May McAvoy
Cocaine, directed by Graham Cutts – (GB)
Cops, directed by Edward F. Cline and Buster Keaton, starring Buster Keaton
Crainquebille (Coster Bill of Paris), directed by Jacques Feyder – (France)

D
A Dangerous Adventure, 15-part serial directed by Sam Warner and Jack L. Warner, starring Grace Darmond
Danse Macabre, directed by Dudley Murphy
Day Dreams, directed by Edward F. Cline and Buster Keaton, Starring Buster Keaton and Renée Adorée
A Debt of Honour, directed by Maurice Elvey, starring Isobel Elsom and Clive Brook – (GB)
The Dictator (lost), directed by James Cruze, starring Wallace Reid and Lila Lee
Dr. Mabuse, der Spieler (Dr. Mabuse the Gambler), directed by Fritz Lang, starring Rudolf Klein-Rogge, based on the 1921 novel by Norbert Jacques – (Germany)
Dr. Jack, directed by Fred C. Newmeyer, starring Harold Lloyd
Don Juan et Faust, directed by Marcel L'Herbier, based on an 1828 play by Christian Dietrich Grabbe – (France)
The Dungeon (lost), written and directed by Oscar Micheaux

E
Estrellita del Cine, directed by José Nepomuceno – (Philippines)
The Electric House, directed by Edward F. Cline and Buster Keaton, starring Buster Keaton
Esmeralda (lost), directed by Edwin J. Collins, starring Sybil Thorndike, based on the 1831 novel The Hunchback of Notre-Dame by Victor Hugo – (GB)

F
Fair Lady, directed by Kenneth Webb
Faust, directed by Challis Sanderson, based on the 1808 play by Johann Wolfgang von Goethe – (GB)
Faust, directed by Gérard Bourgeois, based on the 1808 play by Johann Wolfgang von Goethe – (France)
La Femme de nulle part (The Woman from Nowhere), directed by Louis Delluc – (France)
Flames of Passion, directed by Graham Cutts, starring Mae Marsh and C. Aubrey Smith – (GB)
Flesh and Blood, directed by Irving Cummings, starring Lon Chaney and Noah Beery Sr.
Foolish Wives, starring and directed by Erich von Stroheim
The Frozen North, directed by Edward F. Cline and Buster Keaton, starring Buster Keaton

G
The Ghost Breaker (lost), directed by Alfred E. Green, starring Wallace Reid and Lila Lee, based on the 1909 play by Paul Dickey and Charles W. Goddard
A Gipsy Cavalier, directed by J. Stuart Blackton, starring Georges Carpentier and Flora le Breton – (GB)
Grandma's Boy, directed by Fred C. Newmeyer, starring Harold Lloyd
The Grass Orphan, directed by Frank Hall Crane – (GB)

H
The Haunted House, directed by Erle C. Kenton
Häxan: Witchcraft Through the Ages, starring and directed by Benjamin Christensen – (Sweden/Denmark)
The Headless Horseman, directed by Edward D. Venturini, starring Will Rogers, based of the 1820 short story The Legend of Sleepy Hollow by Washington Irving
Heroes of the Street, directed by William Beaudine, starring Wesley Barry and Marie Prevost

I
In the Name of the Law (lost), directed by Emory Johnson, starring Ralph Lewis and Claire McDowell

L
Laborer's Love (láogōng zhī àiqíng), directed by Zhang Shichuan – (China)
Lorna Doone, directed by Maurice Tourneur, starring Madge Bellamy
The Loves of Pharaoh (Das Weib des Pharao), directed by Ernst Lubitsch, starring Emil Jannings – (Germany)
 Lucrezia Borgia, directed by Richard Oswald, starring Conrad Veidt and Liane Haid – (Germany)

M
The Man from Beyond, directed by Burton L. King, starring Harry Houdini
Manslaughter, directed by Cecil B. DeMille, starring Thomas Meighan and Lois Wilson
Marizza (lost), directed by F. W. Murnau – (Germany)
The Marriage Chance, written and directed by Hampton Del Ruth
Money To Burn (lost), directed by Rowland V. Lee
Moran of the Lady Letty, directed by George Melford, starring Dorothy Dalton and Rudolph Valentino
More to Be Pitied Than Scorned (lost), directed by Edward LeSaint
Mud and Sand, directed by Gilbert Pratt, starring Stan Laurel
My Boy, directed by Victor Heerman and Albert Austin, starring Jackie Coogan
My Wife's Relations, directed by Edward F. Cline and Buster Keaton, starring Buster Keaton

N
Nanook of the North, a documentary directed by Robert J. Flaherty
Nathan the Wise (Nathan der Weise), directed by Manfred Noa – (Germany)
Nice People (lost), directed by William C. deMille, starring Wallace Reid, Bebe Daniels and Conrad Nagel
Nosferatu – Eine Symphonie des Grauens (Nosferatu: A Symphony of Horror), directed by F. W. Murnau, starring Max Schreck, based on the 1897 novel Dracula by Bram Stoker without authorization – (Germany)
Number 13 (lost), directed by Alfred Hitchcock – (GB)

O
Oliver Twist, directed by Frank Lloyd, starring Jackie Coogan and Lon Chaney
One Exciting Night, written and directed by D. W. Griffith
One Glorious Day (lost), directed by James Cruze, starring Will Rogers and Lila Lee

P
The Paleface, directed by Edward F. Cline and Buster Keaton, starring Buster Keaton
Pay Day, a Charles Chaplin short
Peg o' My Heart, directed by King Vidor, starring Laurette Taylor
Phantom, directed by F. W. Murnau, starring Alfred Abel, Lil Dagover and Lya De Putti – (Germany)
Polikushka (Поликушка), directed by Alexander Sanin – (U.S.S.R.)
The Primitive Lover, directed by Sidney Franklin, starring Constance Talmadge and Harrison Ford
The Prisoner of Zenda, directed by Rex Ingram, starring Lewis Stone and Alice Terry

R
Rages to Riches, directed by Wallace Worsley, starring Wesley Barry
Rent Free (lost), directed by Howard Higgin, starring Wallace Reid and Lila Lee
Robin Hood, directed by Allan Dwan, starring Douglas Fairbanks and Wallace Beery
Rob Roy, directed by W. P. Kellino – (GB)

S
Saturday Night, directed by Cecil B. DeMille, starring Leatrice Joy and Conrad Nagel
The Scarlet Letter, directed by Challis Sanderson, starring Sybil Thorndike – (GB)
Shadows, directed by Tom Forman, starring Lon Chaney, Marguerite De La Motte and Harrison Ford
Sherlock Holmes, directed by Albert Parker, starring John Barrymore, based on the 1899 stage play by William Gillette and Arthur Conan Doyle – (GB)
Smilin' Through, directed by Sidney Franklin, starring Norma Talmadge
Sodom and Gomorrah, directed by Michael Curtiz, starring Lucy Doraine – (Austria)
La Souriante Madame Beudet (The Smiling Madame Beudet), directed by Germaine Dulac – (France)
Squibs Wins the Calcutta Sweep, directed by George Pearson, starring Betty Balfour – (GB)
The Suram Fortress (Suramis tsikhe), directed by Ivan Perestiani – (U.S.S.R.)

T
Tess of the Storm Country, directed by John S. Robertson, starring Mary Pickford
The Three Must-Get-Theres, a Max Linder film
The Toll of the Sea, directed by Chester M. Franklin, starring Anna May Wong

W
What's Wrong with the Women? (lost), directed by Roy William Neill, starring Constance Bennett
When Knighthood Was in Flower, directed by Robert G. Vignola, starring Marion Davies
Wildness of Youth, directed by Ivan Abramson

Y
The Young Diana (lost), directed by Albert Capellani and Robert G. Vignola, starring Marion Davies
The Young Rajah. directed by Phil Rosen, starring Rudolph Valentino
Your Best Friend, written and directed by William Nigh, starring Vera Gordon

Short film series
Charlie Chaplin (1914–1923)
Buster Keaton (1917–1941)
Laurel and Hardy (1921–1943)
Our Gang (1922–1944)

Animated short film series

Felix the Cat (1919–1936)
Koko the Clown (1919–1963)
Aesop's Film Fables (1921–1934)

Births
January 2 – Jason Evers, actor (died 2005)
January 3 – Bill Travers, British actor, screenwriter and director (died 1994)
January 10 – Hannelore Schroth, actress (died 1987)
January 13 – Albert Lamorisse, director (died 1970)
January 16 – Irene Vernon, actress (died 1998)
January 17 – Betty White, American actress (died 2021)
January 19 – Guy Madison, actor (died 1996)
January 20 – Ray Anthony, bandleader, trumpeter, songwriter and actor
January 21
Telly Savalas, actor (died 1994)
Paul Scofield, actor (died 2008)
January 31 – Joanne Dru, actress (died 1996)
February 4 – Qin Yi, Chinese actress (died 2022)
February 6 – Patrick Macnee, actor (died 2015)
February 7 – Hattie Jacques, actress (died 1980)
February 8 – Audrey Meadows, actress (died 1996)
February 9 – Kathryn Grayson, singer, actress (died 2010)
February 24 – Steven Hill, actor (died 2016)
February 26 – Margaret Leighton, actress (died 1976)
March 5 – Pier Paolo Pasolini, film director (died 1975)
March 8 – Cyd Charisse, actress, dancer (died 2008)
March 20 – Carl Reiner, comic actor, director and screenwriter (died 2020)
March 21 – Russ Meyer, director, producer (died 2004)
March 31  – Richard Kiley, American actor and singer (died 1999)
April 3 – Doris Day, actress, singer (died 2019)
April 4 - Elmer Bernstein, American composer and conductor (died 2004)
April 5 – Gale Storm, singer, actress (died 2009)
April 7 – Margia Dean, American former beauty queen and actress
April 15 – Michael Ansara, American stage, screen, and voice actor (died 2013)
April 18 – Barbara Hale, American actress (died 2017)
April 24 – J. D. Cannon, American actor (died 2005)
April 26 – Mike Kellin, American actor (died 1983)
April 27 – Jack Klugman, American actor (died 2012)
May 2 – Roscoe Lee Browne, American actor and director (died 2007)
May 7
Rolands Kalniņš, Latvian director, screenwriter and producer (died 2022)
Darren McGavin, American actor (died 2006)
May 10 – Nancy Walker, American actress (died 1992)
May 13 - Truus Dekker, Dutch actress (died 2022)
May 17 - Wei Wei (actress), Chinese actress
May 18 - Bill Macy, American actor (died 2019)
May 27 – Christopher Lee, English actor (died 2015)
May 31 – Denholm Elliott, English actor (died 1992)
June 1
Joan Caulfield, American actress (died 1991)
Joan Copeland, American actress (died 2022)
June 9 – George Axelrod, American scriptwriter and director (died 2003)
June 10
Judy Garland, American singer, actress (died 1969)
Bill Kerr, British-Australian actor and comedian (died 2014)
June 16 – Frances Rafferty, American actress (died 2004)
June 22 – Mona Lisa, Filipina actress (died 2019)
June 26 – Eleanor Parker, American actress (died 2013)
June 28 - Erik Bauersfeld, American voice actor (died 2016)
July 6 – William Schallert, American actor (died 2016)
July 21 – Demeter Bitenc, Slovenian actor (died 2018)
July 26
Blake Edwards, American director (died 2010)
Jason Robards, American actor (died 2000)
July 27 
Adolfo Celi, Italian film actor and director (died 1986)
Norman Lear, American writer and producer
August 1
Arthur Hill, Canadian actor (died 2006)
Paul Lambert, American actor (died 1997)
August 8 – Rory Calhoun, American actor (died 1999)
August 22 – Micheline Presle, French actress
August 25 - Gloria Dea, American actress and musician (died 2023)
September 1 
Vittorio Gassman, Italian actor, director (died 2000)
Yvonne De Carlo, American actress (died 2007)
September 6 – Elizabeth Lawrence (actress), American actress (died 2000)
September 8
Sid Caesar, American comedian, actor (died 2014)
Annabel Maule, British actress
September 10 – Barbara Chilcott, Canadian actress (died 2022)
September 14 – Michel Auclair, European actor (died 1988)
September 15 – Jackie Cooper, American actor, director (died 2011)
September 16 
Guy Hamilton, English director (died 2016)
Janis Paige, American actress
September 23 – Louise Latham, American actress (died 2018)
September 24 – Bert I. Gordon, American filmmaker and visual effects artist (died 2023)
September 29 – Lizabeth Scott, American actress (died 2015)
October 5 – Woodrow Parfrey, American actor (died 1984)
October 7 – Martha Stewart, American actress (died 2021)
October 8 – Eileen Essell, English actress (died 2015)
October 20 – John Anderson, American actor (died 1992)
October 23 – Coleen Gray, American actress (died 2015)
October 27 – Ruby Dee, American actress (died 2014)
October 31 – Barbara Bel Geddes, American actress (died 2005)
November 9 – Dorothy Dandridge, American actress, singer (died 1965)
November 12 – Kim Hunter, actress (died 2002)
November 13 
 Madeleine Sherwood, actress (died 2016)
 Oskar Werner, actor (died 1984)
November 14 – Veronica Lake, American actress (died 1973)
November 15 – Francesco Rosi, film director (died 2015)
November 16 – Royal Dano, American actor (died 1994)
November 22 – Lynne Roberts, American actress (died 1978)
November 26 – Adam Williams, American actor (died 2005)
November 29 – Laurie Main, Australian actor (died 2012)
December 2
 Don Fellows, American actor (died 2007)
 Leo Gordon, American actor and screenplay writer (died 2000)
December 4 – Gérard Philipe, French actor (died 1959)
December 11 – Dilip Kumar, Indian actor (died 2021)
December 21 – Paul Winchell, American ventriloquist, comedian, actor, voice artist, humanitarian and inventor (died 2005)
December 22 – Ruth Roman, actress (died 1999)
December 24 – Ava Gardner, American actress (died 1990)
December 26 – Alfred Dennis (actor), American actor (died 2016)
December 28 
 Ivan Desny, Swiss actor (died 2002) 
 Stan Lee, American comic-book writer, producer and actor (died 2018)

Deaths
February 1 – William Desmond Taylor, film director, victim of an unsolved and widely publicised murder which provoked a great scandal. (born 1872)
February 4 – Florence Deshon, American actress (born 1893)
March 4 – Bert Williams, American actor and singer (born 1874)
May 21 – Sidney Ainsworth, actor (born 1872)
May 26 – Walter Jones, American actor (b.1874) 
June 6 – Lillian Russell, stage and screen actress (born 1860/61)
June 15 – Howard Crampton, actor (born 1865)
July 5 – Bobby Connelly, child star (born 1909)
September 23 – W. Chrystie Miller, veteran stage & screen actor (born 1843)
November 30 – René Cresté, actor and director (born 1881)

Film debuts
 Clara Bow
 Walt Disney – director, producer
 Louise Dresser
 William Haines
 Will Hay
 Edward Everett Horton
 Gene Lockhart
 Anita Louise
 George O'Brien
 William Powell
 Anne Shirley
 Darryl F. Zanuck – director, producer
 Rin Tin Tin

References

External links

 
Film by year